Pradeep K. R. (1961 – 17 February 2022), professionally credited as Pradeep Kottayam, was an Indian actor who primarily worked in Malayalam films and some Tamil films. He is best known for his comedic roles. His role in the 2010 Tamil film Vinnaithaandi Varuvaayaa gave him a breakthrough after a dialogue received public attention.

Career
Pradeep Kottayam started his acting career in 2001 with the film Ee Naadu Innale Vare, directed by I. V. Sasi. In his early stages of his career, he worked as a junior artist, appearing in mainly non speaking roles and uncredited roles. He has appeared in many movies including Rajamanikyam and 2 Harihar Nagar as a bystander in crowd scenes or a non-speaking role. He got a breakthrough in Gautham Vasudev Menon's hit film Vinnaithaandi Varuvaayaa, he had the role of the uncle of heroine Trisha Krishnan which was well noticed. His dialogue in a Tamil movie Vinaythandi Varuvaya "karimeen undd...fish und...mutton und..." became famous in the industry.

His best known works include Aadu Oru Bheegara Jeevi Aanu, Oru Vadakkan Selfie, Life of Josutty, Kunjiramayanam, Welcome to Central Jail, Amar Akbar Antony, Adi Kapyare Kootamani and Kattappanayile Rithwik Roshan. He is known for his special style of rendering dialogues. Mostly, he played comedy, supporting and cameo roles. Pradeep also won the Best Supporting Actor for various roles at 2nd Asianet Comedy Awards 2016. He last acted in Aaraattu starring Mohanlal and directed by B. Unnikrishnan.

Personal life
Pradeep was married to Maya. The couple has two children. He died from heart attack at a private hospital in Kottayam on 17 February 2022, at age 61.

Filmography

 All films are in Malayalam language unless otherwise noted.

References

External links
 

1960s births
2022 deaths
Year of birth missing
21st-century Indian male actors
Indian male film actors
Male actors from Kottayam
Male actors in Malayalam cinema